Tricarbonylchloroglycinatoruthenium(II) is an organoruthenium complex with the formula RuCl(H2NCH2CO2)(CO)3.  A yellow solid, it is an amino acid complex consisting of an octahedral complex with three carbonyls, chloride, and bidentate glycinate ligands.  The CO ligands are arranged in a facial geometry.  The complex is prepared by treating dichlororuthenium tricarbonyl dimer with sodium glycinate.  The complex has attracted attention as a CO-releasing molecule ("CORM").

References

Carbonyl complexes
Coordination complexes
Ruthenium(II) compounds
Chloro complexes